Thottam Pattu is a ballad sung just before performing the Theyyam ritual. These are played in Theyyam temples before the commencement of Theyyam Art.  Thottam Pattu is invocative. This is a mythological belief that by performing this ritual, the performer will  be possessed by  divine spirits. Thottam Pattu, the ritualistic songs which accompany the performance elaborate the legends related to the deities. Percussions such  as Chenda and Thudi accompany the songs. Usually drummer men or make-up men or both of them perform the Thottam pattu by singing during the make-up.

See also
Thottam Pattukal in Malayalam
North Malabar

References

Indian folk songs
Folk ballads
Malayalam-language songs
Arts of Kerala